Bruno Holzträger (29 July 1916 – 15 November 1978) was a Romanian field handball player of German origin who competed in the 1936 Summer Olympics. He was part of the Romanian field handball team, which finished fifth in the Olympic tournament. He played one match.

References
Bruno Holzträger's profile at Sports Reference.com

1916 births
1978 deaths
Field handball players at the 1936 Summer Olympics
Olympic handball players of Romania
Romanian male handball players